Memory is an organism's ability to store, retain, and recall information. 

Memory  or Memories may also refer to:

Memory
Adaptive memory, memory systems that have evolved to help retain survival-and-fitness related information
Collective memory, memory that is shared, passed on and constructed by a group or modern society
Immunological memory, a characteristic of the adaptive immunity
Long memory, a statistical property in which intertemporal dependence decays only slowly
Long-term memory, the ability of the brain to store and recover memories
Working memory or short-term memory, the ability of the brain (or a computer) to temporarily store data while processing it
Body memory, the hypothetical memory function of individual body parts or cells
Implicit memory, a type in which previous experiences help to perform a task with no awareness of those experiences
Procedural memory, a type most frequently below conscious awareness that helps perform particular types of action
Muscle memory is a form of procedural memory also known as motor learning
Genetic memory (psychology), present at birth and exists in the absence of sensory experience

Technology
Battery memory, an effect observed in nickel cadmium rechargeable batteries that causes them to hold less charge
Semiconductor memory, electronic memory used in digital electronics, for example:
Computer memory, devices that are used to store data or programs on a temporary or permanent basis for use in a computer
Read-only memory, semiconductor memory that cannot be modified
Volatile memory, semiconductor memory that requires power to maintain the stored information
Non-volatile memory, semiconductor memory that can retain the stored information even when not powered
Computer data storage, computer components, devices, and recording media that retain digital data
Plastic deformation of some elastic material that has been subjected to prolonged stress.
Memory foam, a material that molds to the shape of a warm body but returns to its original shape on cooling
Shape-memory alloy can be deformed when cold but returns to its pre-deformed ("remembered") shape when heated

Art
 Memory (French), an 1886–1887 marble sculpture by Daniel Chester French
 Memory, the Heart, also known as Memory, a 1937 painting by Frida Kahlo

Books
"Memory" (H. P. Lovecraft), a short story by H.P. Lovecraft
"Memory" (Poul Anderson), a 1957 science fiction narration by Poul Anderson
"Memory" (Stephen King), a short story by Stephen King
Memory (Bujold novel), a 1996 novel in the Vorkosigan Saga by Lois McMaster Bujold
Memory (Westlake novel), a 2010 novel by Donald E. Westlake
Memory, a 1987 novel by Margaret Mahy

Film and television
Memory, a 1971 documentary by Grigori Chukhrai
Memories (1995 film), a 1995 anime film by Otomo Katsuhiro
Memory, 2004 short film featuring Kimberly Norris Guerrero
Memory (2006 film), a techno-thriller by Bennett Joshua Davlin
Memory (2008 film), a Thai horror film
Memories (2013 film), a Malayalam film
Memories (2014 film), a French film
"Memories" (The Twilight Zone), an episode of The Twilight Zone
Memory (TV series), a 2016 South Korean drama
Memory (2022 film), an action-thriller film by Martin Campbell

Music
Memories (radio network), or Unforgettable Favorites

Albums
Memory (Dan Michaelson and The Coastguards album), 2016
Memory (EP), by Mamamoo, 2016
Memory (Vivian Girls album), 2019
Memory, a 2018 Hélène Grimaud album
Memories (Pat Boone album), 1966
Memories (Abdullah Ibrahim album), 1973
Memories (mind.in.a.box album), 2015
Memories (Barbra Streisand album), 1981
Memories (The Vogues album), 1968
Memories (Doc Watson album), 1975
Memories: The Best of Elaine Paige, a 1987 compilation album by Elaine Paige
Memories: The '68 Comeback Special, a 1998 Elvis Presley compilation album
Memories...Do Not Open, a 2017 album by The Chainsmokers

Songs
"Memory" (Cats song), a song from the 1981 musical Cats
"Memory" (Sugarcult song), 2004
"Memory" (Kane Brown and Blackbear song), 2021
"Memory", a 1912 art song by the classical composer John Ireland on lyrics by the poet William Blake
"Memory", a 1959 art song by the classical composer Ned Rorem on lyrics by the poet Theodore Roethke
"Memory", a track from the soundtrack of the 2015 video game Undertale by Toby Fox
"Memories" (1915 song), by Egbert Van Alstyne and Gustave Kahn
"Memories" (Hugh Hopper song), a 1960s song covered by Daevid Allen, Robert Wyatt, Whitney Houston, and others
"Memories" (Elvis Presley song), 1968
"Memories" (David Guetta song), 2010
"Memories" (Harold Faltermeyer song), 1986
"Memories" (Public Image Ltd song), 1979
"Memories" (Vamps song), 2010
"Memories" (Within Temptation song), 2005
"Memories" (Weezer song), 2010
"Memories" (Maroon 5 song), 2019
"Memories", by Beverley Craven
"Memories", by Earth and Fire
"Memories", by Joe Satriani from the album Not of This Earth
"Memories", by Leonard Cohen from the album Death of a Ladies' Man
"Memories", by Morris Albert
"Memories", by Panic! At The Disco from the album Vices & Virtues
"Memories", by Super Junior from the album Mr. Simple
"Memories", by The Temptations from the album A Song for You

Other
Pamyat (Память, "memory"), a Russian ultra-nationalist organization

See also
Meme
Art of memory
Concentration (game) or "Memory", a card game
Shape memory alloy
"The Way We Were" (song), which includes the lyrics "Memories, light the corners of my mind"